Yoshinotani Akitoshi (born Sakuri Yoshitani; April 23, 1949 – January 14, 2000) was a sumo wrestler from Miiraku, Nagasaki, Japan. He made his professional debut in May 1965 and reached the top division in January 1974. His shikona was adapted from own surname of Yoshitani after he had previously used Utonoyama. His highest rank was maegashira 4 and he fought in seven top division tournaments, although he struggled with a persistent elbow injury. He was one of the smallest sekitori, weighing less than 100kg for much of his career. He was a contemporary of Washuyama, another small wrestler from Dewanoumi stable.  He won the jūryō division championship in September 1973 with an 11–4 record, despite losing his last three matches. In May 1978 he inflicted the first defeat of future ōzeki Asashio's career to secure his majority of wins on the final day of the tournament. His final tournament as a sekitori was in November 1978. He fought in 102 tournaments in total, 27 as a sekitori, with no bouts missed and 930 career matches. Upon retirement from active competition in May 1982 he became an elder in the Japan Sumo Association under a series of different names, since he didn't own a toshiyori-kabu of his own. He died while active as Onaruto-oyakata of multiple organ failure in January 2000, having been ill for several months.

Career record

See also
Glossary of sumo terms
List of past sumo wrestlers
List of sumo tournament second division champions

References

1949 births
Japanese sumo wrestlers
Sumo people from Nagasaki Prefecture
2000 deaths